The Chicago mayoral election of 1999, which took place on February 23, 1999, resulted in the re-election of incumbent Richard M. Daley over Bobby Rush, with 428,872 votes to Rush's 167,709. Daley garnered a landslide 71.9% of the total vote, winning by a 44-point margin. This was the first officially nonpartisan Chicago mayoral election, per a 1995 Illinois law.

As was the case in all of his reelection campaigns, Daley did not attend any debates.

Joe Banks Jr. was denied inclusion on the ballot due to issues regarding the filing of his nomination papers.

Endorsements

Results

Daley won a majority of the vote in 33 of the city's 50 wards. Rush won a majority of the vote in the remaining 17 wards.

Results by ward

References

1999
Chicago
1999 Illinois elections
1990s in Chicago
1999 in Illinois
Richard M. Daley